Eublemma pudica is a moth of the family Erebidae first described by Snellen in 1880. It is found in Sri Lanka, India, Fiji and Australia.

Adult wingspan is 1.3 cm. Forewings pale brown with a shaded dark band across the middle. A black spot found at the wingtip. Hindwings pale brown with a shaded dark triangle on the margin.

References

External links
Semiochemicals of Eublemma pudica

Moths of Asia
Moths described in 1880
Boletobiinae